Pearcy is an unincorporated community and census-designated place (CDP) in Garland County, Arkansas, United States. It was first listed as a CDP in the 2020 census with a population of 306.

Mayor is Little rock native Darius Martin.

Bruce Cozart, Republican member of the Arkansas House of Representatives from District 24, is a Pearcy native and a developer in Hot Springs.

In 2009 the rural community became noted as the site of the Pearcy murders, said to be a "robbery gone wrong." On November 12, 2009, 80-year-old Edward Gentry Sr., his 56-year-old son Edward Jr., Edward Jr.'s 52-year-old wife Pam, Pam and Edward Jr.'s 24-year-old son Jeremy, and Jeremy's 19-year-old girlfriend were burglarized and shot to death in Pearcy. The charred bodies of the last four victims were found together in Gentry Jr's mobile home, which had been burned to destroy evidence. Samuel Conway and Jeremy Pickney were charged with murdering the family and a third suspect, Marvin Stringer, was killed in a shootout when police sought to arrest the suspects. The motive was said to be revenge for 24-year-old Jeremy Gentry's having stolen tires and rims from Conway's older brother. Conway was convicted of capital murder and aggravated burglary, and sentenced to life in prison without parole; Pickney pleaded guilty to lesser charges and was sentenced to 50 years in prison.

On April 25, 2011, a tornado associated with the 2011 Super Outbreak hit the Pearcy area, destroying houses in nearby Sunshine.

Demographics

2020 census

Note: the US Census treats Hispanic/Latino as an ethnic category. This table excludes Latinos from the racial categories and assigns them to a separate category. Hispanics/Latinos can be of any race.

Education
It is in the Lake Hamilton School District.

References

Unincorporated communities in Garland County, Arkansas
Unincorporated communities in Arkansas
Census-designated places in Garland County, Arkansas
Census-designated places in Arkansas